Luca Matteo Caracciolo (died 1526) was a Roman Catholic prelate who served as Bishop of Lesina (1507–1526).

Biography
On 4 August 1507, Luca Matteo Caracciolo was appointed during the papacy of Pope Julius II as Bishop of Lesina.
He served as Bishop of Lesina until his death in 1526.

References 

16th-century Italian Roman Catholic bishops
Bishops appointed by Pope Julius II
1526 deaths